Dohneh (also Romanized as Dahaneh, Dohīneh, Duhinah, and Dukhinakh) is a village in Chuqur Rural District, Tarom Sofla District, Qazvin County, Qazvin Province, Iran. At the 2006 census, its population was 94, in 24 families.

References 

Populated places in Qazvin County